Freeport High School is a public high school in Freeport, Maine, United States for students in grades 9–12 residing in the towns of Freeport, Durham, and Pownal. Freeport High School is one of four schools in the Freeport School District; the others being Mast Landing School, Morse Street School, and Freeport Middle School.

Student population
The student population at Freeport High School for the 2018-2019 school year was approximately 600 students.

Notable alumni
 Stephen Gill Spottswood - Bishop of the African Methodist Episcopal Zion Church, Chairman of the NAACP
 Drew Taggert - Member of The Chainsmokers

Academics

SAT results
As with other districts in the Greater Portland area, the SAT scores of Freeport High School were significantly higher than the state average, coming in 10th in the state for Math and Reading, and 11th in Writing in 2007.

In the Mathematics section, Freeport students had an average score of 485, tying with York High School. In the Reading section, Freeport students had an average score of 492, tying with Scarborough High School. Finally, in the writing section, Freeport students received an average score of 483.

In the 2012-2013 school year, Maine Department of Education reports showed that 50% of students were meeting the standards on the mathematics section of the test, higher than the state average of 48.1 percent. In the reading section, 59.6 percent of students were reading at or above their grade level, higher than the state average of 48.9 percent. While the state average on the SAT writing section had dropped more than three percent from the previous school year, 48.5 percent of Freeport students met the grade-level standard on the writing section, nearly five points higher than the state average.

In 2017, the average SAT score was 1006, higher than the state average of 994. This included a 507 in the reading section and a 499 in the mathematics section.

Graduation rates
Between the 2010–2011 and 2013–2014 school years, Regional School Unit 5 (of which Freeport High School is the main secondary school) reported graduation rates of 92%.

One-act plays
Freeport High School is one of only two schools in the state that consistently enters student written one-act plays into the Maine Principals' Association's annual drama festival, the other being Morse High School.

Athletics

In 2016, the seventh seeded varsity baseball team had a historic playoff run, winning a playoff game for the first time since 1985 in the preliminary round and making it to the state championship game for the first time, where they lost to Old Town. Brandon Cass was named the MVP of the season by Craig Sickels of Freeport High School. Their school fight song is "Country Roads", often sung after physically dominating a rival school on the field/court/track etc.

State titles

Boys' Basketball: 1959, 1960, 1964, 1966, 1969 Class C State Champions.

References

External links
 Freeport High School Website

Buildings and structures in Freeport, Maine
Public high schools in Maine
High schools in Cumberland County, Maine
1961 establishments in Maine